Timiryazevskaya is the western terminus of the Moscow Monorail.

History 
The station was opened on 20 November 2004 for exiting and 9 days later for entering. It began operation in "excursion mode". Only two trains were operating at the line, the interval between trains was as long as 30 minutes and station hours were from 10:00 to 16:00. The passengers could only board the trains at Ulitsa Sergeya Eisensteina station.

On 10 January 2008 the line began regular operation serving passengers 6:50 - 23:00 and allowing them board trains at any station of the line. Also the ticket price was reduced from 50 to 19 rubles.

References 

Moscow Monorail
Railway stations opened in 2004